Jason Sosa (born March 10, 1988) is an American former professional boxer of Puerto Rican descent, who held the WBA (Regular) super featherweight title from 2016 to 2017.

Professional boxing career 
Sosa made his professional debut in November 2009 defeating Jonathan Ocasio by knockout in the three round in Philadelphia, USA.

Sosa vs. Fortuna 
He won the WBA super featherweight title in June 2016 with an eleven-round win over Javier Fortuna in Beijing.

Sosa vs. Smith 
He had his first title defense on November 12, 2016, Against Stephen Smith. Sosa won the fight convincingly, winning on all three scorecards, 117–110, 116-112 and 116–111.

Sosa vs. Lomachenko 
In his next bout, Sosa fought WBO super featherweight champion Vasyl Lomachenko. Lomachenko dominated Sosa over nine rounds and Sosa retired in his corner after the end of the ninth round.

Professional boxing record

References

External links
 
 Jason Sosa - Profile, News Archive & Current Rankings at Box.Live

Living people
1988 births
Puerto Rican male boxers
American male boxers
Super-featherweight boxers
World super-featherweight boxing champions
World Boxing Association champions